Joel A. Pisano (March 3, 1949 – February 26, 2021) was a United States district judge of the United States District Court for the District of New Jersey from 2000 to 2015. He served as a United States magistrate judge of the same court from 1991 to 2000.

Early life and education
Born in Orange, New Jersey, Pisano graduated from Belleville High School, received a Bachelor of Arts degree from Lafayette College in 1971 and a Juris Doctor from Seton Hall University School of Law in 1974.

Career
Pisano was an assistant deputy public defender in the New Jersey Office of the Public Defender from 1974 to 1978. He was in private practice in New Jersey from 1978 to 1991.

Judicial service
Pisano was a United States magistrate judge of the District of New Jersey from 1991 to 2000. On September 22, 1999, Pisano was nominated by President Bill Clinton to a seat on the United States District Court for the District of New Jersey vacated by the elevation of Maryanne Trump Barry to the Third Circuit. Pisano was confirmed by the United States Senate on February 10, 2000, and received his commission on February 16, 2000. He retired from active service on February 16, 2015.

Death
Pisano died on February 26, 2021, at the age of 71.

References

External links

1949 births
2021 deaths
20th-century American judges
21st-century American judges
American people of Italian descent
Belleville High School (New Jersey) alumni
Judges of the United States District Court for the District of New Jersey
United States district court judges appointed by Bill Clinton
Lafayette College alumni
Seton Hall University School of Law alumni
People from Orange, New Jersey
New Jersey lawyers
Public defenders
United States magistrate judges